The Jolarpettai–Shoranur line connects Jolarpettai, on the Chennai Central–Bangalore City line  in the Indian state of Tamil Nadu and Shoranur in Kerala. Incoming from Chennai/ Tirupati side via Arakkonam and Katpadi at Jolarpettai, there are several branch lines: Jolarpettai–Bangarapet–Bangalore, Salem–Omalur–Mettur Dam/Dharmapuri–Hosur–Yeshvantapur, Salem–Namakkal–Karur, Salem–Virudhachalam–Villupuram, Erode–Karur, Irugur/Podanur–Coimbatore–Mettupalayam and Palakkad–Dindigul. From Shoranur, the railway lines further branches out towards Kozhikode, Nilambur and Thrissur sides in Kerala. This network links the railway network in Kerala to the networks in Tamil Nadu and Karnataka, and subsequently other states.

History
The first train service in southern India and the third in India was operated by Madras Railway from  / Veyasarapady to Wallajah Road (Arcot) in 1856. Madras Railway extended its trunk route to Beypur / Kadalundi (near Calicut) in 1861

The metre-gauge Podanur–Mettupalayam line was opened to traffic in 1873. The UNESCO heritage track, Nilgiri Mountain Railway was opened in two stages. The Mettupalayam–Coonoor section was opened in 1899 and it was extended up to Udhagamandalam (Ooty) in 1908. The Podanur–Mettuapalayam section was converted to broad gauge in early 2000s.

Two -wide narrow gauge famine-protective lines were opened in the early years of the twentieth century. The Hosur–Dharmapuri line was decommissioned in 1941 and other two lines were closed around 1945.

The -long -wide metre-gauge Salem–Bangalore line was opened in 1969. It was converted to  broad gauge in 1997.

Electrification
The mainline was electrified in stages. The Jolarpettai–Morappur sector was electrified in 1989–90, the Morappur–Salem (excluded) in 1990–91, the Salem–Erode sector in 1991–92, the Tiruppur–Walayar sector including Coimbatore in 1995–96, and the Waylar–Vallatolnagar (beyond Shoranur, towards Ernakulam)  in 1996–97. The Magnesite–Mettur Dam sector was electrified in 1990–91. The electrification of Coimbatore–Mettuapalayam was completed in 2015.

Speed limit
Though the Arakkonam–Jolarpettai–Salem–Erode–Palakkad–Ernakulam line is classified as a "Group B" line which can take speeds up to 130 km/h, the maximum permissible speed is 110 km/hr.

Loco sheds
The Diesel Loco Shed, Erode holds WDM-2, WDM-3A, WDM-3D, WDG-3A and WDG-4 locos. And the Electric Loco Shed, Erode holds WAG-7 and WAP-4 and WAP-7 locos. It is home to the largest fleet of WAP-4 locos on Indian Railways and handles some of the longest routes for electric trains in the country.

Jolarpettai has an electric/ diesel trip shed.

Passenger movement
Salem, Coimbatore, Erode and Palakkad, on this line, are among the top hundred booking stations of Indian Railway.

Stations 
There are 38 railway stations along the stretch within Salem Railway Division and 40 railway stations within Tamil Nadu. The major stations are Coimbatore Main Junction (CBE), Coimbatore North Junction (CBF), Tiruppur (TUP), Pollachi (POY), Salem Jn (SA), Erode Jn (ED), and Podanur Junction (PTJ).

References

External links
Trains at Salem
Trains at Coimbatore Main
Trains at Erode
Trains at Palakkad

5 ft 6 in gauge railways in India
Rail transport in Tamil Nadu
Rail transport in Kerala
Rail transport in Karnataka

Jolarpet
Railway lines opened in 1861